Mary MacKillop College may refer to:

 Mary MacKillop Catholic Regional College, Leongatha, Victoria
 Mary MacKillop College, Brisbane, a member of the Catholic Secondary Schoolgirls' Sports Association
 Mary MacKillop College, Kensington, Adelaide, South Australia
 Mary MacKillop College, Wakeley, Sydney, New South Wales
 St Mary MacKillop College, Albury
 St Mary MacKillop College, Canberra

See also
Mary MacKillop (disambiguation)